is a Japanese handball player who has played for the Japan women's national handball team and plays for Japanese club Hiroshima Maple Reds. She was listed among the top ten goalscorers at the 2009 World Women's Handball Championship in China, with 48 goals.

References

Living people
1984 births
Japanese female handball players
Asian Games medalists in handball
Handball players at the 2006 Asian Games
Handball players at the 2010 Asian Games
Asian Games silver medalists for Japan
Asian Games bronze medalists for Japan
Medalists at the 2006 Asian Games
Medalists at the 2010 Asian Games
20th-century Japanese women
21st-century Japanese women